The 2013 Martyr's Memorial B-Division League was the 2013 season of the Martyr's Memorial B-Division League. A total of 13 teams competed in the league. The season started on 28 January 2013 and concluded on 5 March 2013. Boys Union Club won the league on the final matchday and were promoted to 2013–14 Martyr's Memorial A-Division League.

Teams
Star Club, who participated in the 2011 Martyr's Memorial B-Division League did not participate in the league.

Venues
The league was played centrally in one venues in Kathmandu.

League table

Awards

References

Martyr's Memorial B-Division League seasons
2
Nepal